Bakkeskov is a manor house and estate located eight kilometres north of Præstø, Denmark. The Neoclassical main building was built for Charles August Selby in 1796-98 and was listed on the Danish registry of protected buildings and places in 1918. It is located on a small hilltop in a parkland setting with views of Præstø Inlet. The home farm is located a few kilometres to the southwest of the main building. The estate is owned by Michael Immanuel Jebsen, the eldest son of Hong Kong-based businessman Hans Michael Jebsen.

History

Early history
 
Bækkeskov was originally one of several small manors in the vicinity of the village of Akselhoved. It was owned by Joachim Beck in the late 16th century and was then passed on to his daughter Vibeke Beck Galde. The estate became crown land when a later owner, Christoffer Galde, died unmarried in 1631. His closest relative, a sister, had already given up her heritage to the crown many years earlier and the estate was therefore included in Vordingborg Fief.

The crown sold Bækkeskov to Merete Grubbe after just two years. She later sold it to Christoffer Godskesen Lindenov. He left the estate to his daughter. Anne Elisabeth Christoffersdatter Lindenov, who had become a widow two years earlier. She sold it to Otto Krabbe in 1791. He was already the owner of Holmegaard.

Sken Skinkel acquired Bækkeskov in 1693. In 1729, it was purchased by Knud Ahasverus Becker. He was the son of a ferryman from Hvalpsund but had become inspector of Vallø after marrying the daughter of court tailor Brummondt. In 1718, he was appointed as deputy district judge of Lolland and Falster. He was known for his brutal treatment of the farmers on his estate. In August 1738, he was assaulted and killed after correcting and beating one of the farmers. 11 farmers were later sentenced to death.

The von Munthe af Morgenstierne family
 
Bredo Munthe purchased Bækkeskov in 1741. He placed the land from some of the tenant farms directly under the manor, modernized the management of the estate and improved the fam buildings. He was ennobled ny letters patent under the name von Munthe af Morgenstierne in 1755. He died on the estate on 13 January 1757. His widow Anna Dorothea von Munthe af Morgenstjerne née Smith passed Bækkeskov on to their eldest son Otto Christopher von Munthe af Morgenstierne in 1759. He shut down the small village of Bækkeskov and instead incorporated all its land directly under the manor. He sold the estate in 1795,

1795-1843: Changing owners
The new owner was the English-born merchant Charles August Selby. He had founded the merchant house Selby & Co. in Copenhagen in 1777. He retired on the estate. He changed the operations with inspiration from England, introducing stable feeding, cattle fattening and the cultivation of beetroot, cabbage and potatoes. Charles August Selby solgte Bækkeskov in 1805. He died at Güldenstein in Holsten in 1823,

1843–1923: The Vind family
 
 
Christian Vind acquired Bækkeskov in 1844. His widow kept the estate after his death in 1869. It was later taken over by their son Emil Vind who spent most of his time abroad as Danish envoy in St. Petersburg and Berlin. He had no children and Bækkeskov was therefore endowed to his nephew Ove Vind. He initially acquired more land but had to sell all the tenant farms in 1920 as a result of the land reforms of 1919.

Later history
More of the land was sold to the government in 1923 and converted into smallholdings.

Peter Hermann Zobel purchased Bækkeskov in 1996. He retired as CEO of the insurance company Codan in 1999.

Architecture
The main building is designed in the Neoclassical style. It consists of two storeys over a high cellar and has a rectangular floor plan. The central part of the southern facade features four Ionic pilasters. The building has sash window, an influence from English architecture. The hipped, black-glazed tile roof features four dormer windows on each side.

Today
The estate covers 745.8 hectares of land of which 180.2 hectares are farmland and 450 hectares are woodland.

List of owners
 (      -      ) Joachim Beck
 (      -1609) Vibeke Galde, née Beck
 (1609-1631) Christoffer Galde
 (1631-1633) The Crown
 (1633-      ) Merete Grubbe, gift Urne
 (      -1679) Christoffer Godskesen Lindenov
 (1679-1691) Anne Elisabeth Christoffersdatter Lindenov, gift Urne
 (1691-1693) Otto Krabbe
 (1693-1711) Sten Skinkel
 (1711-1718) Anne Marie von Offenberg, gift Skinkel
 (1718-1729) Rudolf Skinkel
 (1729-1738) Knud Ahasverus Becker
 (1738-      ) Helene Marie Brummondt, gift 1) Becker, 2) Folsach
 (      -1741) Hans Folsach
 (1741-1757) Bredo von Munthe af Morgenstierne
 (1757-1759) Anna Dorothea Smith, gift von Munthe af Morgenstierne
 (1759-1795) Otto Christopher von Munthe af Morgenstierne
 (1795-1805) Charles August Selby
 (1805-1810) Peter Benedikt Petersen
 (1810-1843) Mikkel Leigh Smith
 (1843-1844) Cecile Caroline de Coninck, gift Smith
 (1844-1869) Christian Andreas Vind
 (1869-1881) Anne Sophie Elisabeth Hoppe gift Vind
 (1881-1906) Carl Rudolph Emil Vind
 (1906-1923) Ove Frederik Christian Vind
 (1923-1924) E. Bruun
 (1924-1926) E. Bruun
 (1926-1929) P.F. Lagoni
 (1929-1936) Emil Victor Schau Lassen
 (1936-1942) Siegfried Victor Raben-Levetzau
 (1942-1975) Else Illum, gift Trock-Jansen
 (1975-1996) Børge Hinsch
 (1996-2017) Peter Hermann Zobel
  Bækkeskov Gods A/S (Michael Immanuel Jebsen, a son of Hans Michael Jebsen)

References

Rxternal links

 Bækkeskov
 Drawing in the Danish National Art Library

Manor houses in Næstved Municipality
Listed buildings and structures in Næstved Municipality
Houses completed in 1798